Diazole refers to either one of a pair of isomeric chemical compounds with molecular formula C3H4N2, having a five-membered ring consisting of three carbon atoms and two nitrogen atoms.

The two isomers are:

Imidazole (1,3-diazole)  
Pyrazole  (1,2-diazole)

References